The EFFECTS (stylized as the EFFECTS) are a Washington, D.C. based math rock band consisting of Devin Ocampo, Matthew Dowling, and David Rich. They have released four digital EPs and a full-length album, Eyes to the Light, on Dischord Records.

Formed in Washington, D.C. in 2014, the band's music takes inspiration from indie rock, post-hardcore, and progressive rock and has been described as providing an "updated take on the D.C. sound."

Ocampo is a former member of the Washington, D.C. groups Faraquet, Medications, Smart Went Crazy, and Deathfix. Additionally, he has toured and recorded with Beauty Pill, Mary Timony, and J. Robbins. Dowling was a member of D.C.-based indie rock band, Deleted Scenes and Rich performed in the band Buildings 
.

The trio's debut album was greeted with praise in Washington City Paper, Bandcamp Daily, and Post Trash.

Discography
 Eyes to the Light (2017 LP)

References

External links

Devin Ocampo Discusses The Effects, DIY, and Having Fun
The EFFECTS Can’t Take It Anymore
The Effects – ‘Eyes To The Light’

Musical groups from Washington, D.C.
Dischord Records artists